List of countries by GDP per capita growth may refer to one of two articles:

 List of countries by GDP (real) per capita growth rate, which only measures the nominal dollar figure after correcting for inflation, or
 List of countries by GDP (PPP) per capita growth rate, which adjusts it for the price level in the country.